Monica Irasema Duran (born January 8, 1960) is an American politician who is a member of the Colorado House of Representatives representing the 23rd district, which includes the communities of Lakewood, Wheat Ridge, Applewood, Mountain View, and East Pleasant View, in Jefferson County. Prior to reapportionment, Duran represented the 24th district in Jefferson County.

Biography 
Before getting involved in politics. Duran worked in the dental industry for more than 30 years.

Political career
Duran was elected in the general election on November 6, 2018, winning 63 percent of the vote over 37 percent of Republican candidate Arthur Erwin. She was previously a member of the City Council for Wheat Ridge, Colorado. Shw was re-elected in 2020.

From 2020 to 2022, Duran served as majority co-whip for the House. She is a member of the Colorado Democratic Latino Caucus, the Children's Caucus, and the Colorado Legislative Animal Welfare Caucus. Duran also co-chairs the General Assembly's Democratic Women's Caucus.

During her tenure, Duran has sponsored bills that included creating minimum standards of care for animal shelters and rescues, creating a office to improve work on missing or murder cases involving indigenous people and a bill aimed at protecting domestic abuse victims by preventing abusers from possessing firearms.

In November 2022, Duran was selected to become the majority leader of the Colorado House of Representatives for the 2023 legislative session.

References

1960 births
21st-century American politicians
21st-century American women politicians
American politicians of Mexican descent
Colorado city council members
Duran, Monica
Hispanic and Latino American city council members
Hispanic and Latino American state legislators in Colorado
Hispanic and Latino American women in politics
Living people
Politicians from Cheyenne, Wyoming
Women city councillors in Colorado
Women state legislators in Colorado